Before the Revolution: America's Ancient Pasts is a nonfiction book-length scholarly history written by Daniel K. Richter and published by Belknap Press (of Harvard University Press) in May 2013. It covers the stages of North America's deep historical roots well before the American Revolution, theorizing that these stages shaped recent history and the present. The book is divided into six major sections: "Progenitors," "Conquistadors," "Traders," "Planters," "Imperialists," and "Atlanteans".

Author
Daniel K. Richter is a professor of American history at the University of Pennsylvania and book author. He researches, teaches, and writes about colonial North America and Native American history before 1800. He served as acting chair for UPenn's History Department during 2013–2014. His PhD is from Columbia University.

See also

 List of pre-Columbian cultures
 Metallurgy in pre-Columbian America
 Pre-Columbian trans-oceanic contact
 Population history of indigenous peoples of the Americas
 Archaeology of the Americas
 Columbian Exchange
 European colonization of the Americas
 Forest gardening
 Indian massacres

Related books

 1491: New Revelations of the Americas Before Columbus authored by Charles C. Mann 
 Indian Givers: How the Indians of the Americas Transformed the World authored by Jack Weatherford.

References

External links
Publisher's page
America's Ancient Pasts. 30 January 2014. Video. C-SPAN.org
Google Scholar coverage

History books about the United States
Native American history
Books about Native American history
History books about Canada
Belknap Press books